Andrea Jean Hall (born October 31, 1947) is a retired American soap opera actress.

Personal life
Hall is the identical twin sister of soap actress Deidre Hall.

Career
From 1977 to 1982, Hall played Samantha Evans, the twin of her sister Deidre's character Marlena Evans, on Days of Our Lives. She returned to the show playing a Marlena-lookalike, Hattie Adams, from 2000 to 2001.

In 1989, Hall ran PuppyTracks, a mail-order company that manufactured mugs, music, sweatshirts, and other items related to TV soap operas.

Filmography

References

External links
 

1947 births
American soap opera actresses
American television actresses
American twins
Identical twin actresses
Actresses from Milwaukee
Actresses from Florida
Living people
People from Lake Worth Beach, Florida
21st-century American women